Alasmidonta viridis, the slippershell mussel, is a species of mussel in the family Unionidae, the river mussels. It is native to the United States.

Alasmidonta viridis is most commonly found throughout Miami during November to March.

References

viridis
Bivalves described in 1820
Taxa named by Constantine Samuel Rafinesque